The TurboGrafx-16 Mini, also known as the  in Japan and PC Engine CoreGrafx Mini in Europe, is a dedicated home video game console by Konami modeled on NEC's TurboGrafx-16, which was designed by Hudson Soft, a video game developer which Konami acquired in 2012. The Mini emulates the original console's 8-bit hardware. The Japanese model contains 58 games in total while the international models contain 57. The Mini was originally set to be released worldwide on March 19, 2020, exclusively through Amazon, but was delayed everywhere except for Japan because of the COVID-19 pandemic. It was shipped in North America on May 22, 2020, and in Europe on June 5, 2020.

Hardware 
The Mini is half the size of the original TurboGrafx-16 video game console and can support two controllers (instead of one) out of the box. It includes one full-size replica controller (that connects through USB, so that original controllers are incompatible), a USB-to-Micro-B power cable and an HDMI video cable. Sold exclusively through Amazon, there are separate Mini console releases for North America, Europe and Japan, as the Mini and its included controller that reproduces the original console's regional decal and color variations.

Games 
Sixty titles were announced between all regions for the Mini, 54 of which are unique. Konami lists the titles either under the category of "TurboGrafx-16" for the American games or "PC Engine" for the Japanese games; though this listing is heavily simplified as TurboGrafx-CD/CD-ROM², Super CD-ROM², Arcade CD-ROM² and SuperGrafx titles are also included on all regions of the Mini. The Japanese model includes 24 TurboGrafx-16 (American) games and 34 PC Engine (Japanese) games for a total of 58 games. The international model, however, includes 25 TurboGrafx-16 (American) games and 32 PC Engine (Japanese) games for a total of 57 games. Five of the games are counted twice by Konami as they are available in both their TurboGrafx-16 (American) and PC Engine (Japanese) versions on all regions' models. The title Splatterhouse is also technically counted twice, with the uncensored PC Engine (Japanese) version being exclusive to the Japanese model and the censored TurboGrafx-16 (American) version being exclusive to the international models. In addition, three of the other PC Engine (Japanese) games are also exclusive to a specific region, with Tokimeki Memorial and Tengai Makyō II: Manji Maru being exclusive to the Japanese model and Salamander being exclusive to the international models. Aside from Splatterhouse and the five games listed as two game titles, all TurboGrafx-16 listed games remain in English only and all PC Engine listed games remain in Japanese only respectively on all region's model of the Mini (even if both an English and Japanese version exist due to the game being released in both regions during the original console's lifespan). Castlevania: Rondo of Blood Includes a mini-game named "Akumajyo Dracula Peke", Soldier Blade also has its Caravan edition, while Gradius, Fantasy Zone and Salamander have received arrangements listed as "near arcade" versions. These five alternative versions can be played by highlighting them and holding Select while booting the desired game. Tokimeki Memorial and Salamander include the mini-games Force Gear and Twinbee Returns, which are available through cheat codes.

Production and release 
The Mini was first announced at the E3 show in June 2019. The announcement was part of a trend of releasing smaller versions of 1980s and 1990s retro video game consoles.

Through its Japanese YouTube channel, Konami revealed all of the titles from the Mini's line-up, including American, European and Japanese line-ups. The Japanese game controller maker Hori also revealed some accessories for the Mini, including a Turbo Pad controller, a multitap that add the number of players up to five and an AC Adapter that accepts USB A to USB Micro-B connectors. American and European representative stores of Hori Japan sell them through their area of continents coverage.

On March 6, 2020, Konami announced that the launch of the TurboGrafx-16 Mini and its peripheral accessories would be delayed indefinitely due to the COVID-19 outbreak. The console was shipped in North America on May 22, 2020. The CoreGrafx Mini was released in Europe on June 5, 2020.

References

External links 
 

Dedicated consoles
2020s toys
Konami
TurboGrafx-16
Impact of the COVID-19 pandemic on the video game industry
2020 in video gaming
Retro style
ARM-based video game consoles